Morgan Hill is a city in Santa Clara County, California, at the southern tip of Silicon Valley, in the San Francisco Bay Area. Morgan Hill is an affluent residential community, the seat of several high-tech companies, and a dining, entertainment, and recreational destination, owing to its luxury hospitality, wineries, and nature parks.

History

Prior to the arrival of Spanish colonists, the area of the Santa Clara Valley had been inhabited by the Tamyen nation of Ohlone people for more than 6,000 years. In the area of what is now Morgan Hill, the Matalan tribe lived in a hunter-gatherer society.

Before the area was colonized as part of the Alta California province of the Viceroyalty of New Spain, the 1772 Spanish expedition, led by Pedro Fages and Father Juan Crespí, camped in what is now Morgan Hill, alongside Llagas Creek. The location of their camp subsequently became a popular campsite for Spanish soldiers on their way from New Spain to Alta California. With the founding of Mission Santa Clara de Asís, in 1777, the lands of present-day Morgan Hill were granted to the Roman Catholic Church.

Following Mexico's independence from Spain, land was redistributed to Mexican citizens across California and the land encompassing modern-day Morgan Hill was granted to Juan Maria Hernandez, in 1835.  In 1845, Martin Murphy Sr., an Irish-born Mexican citizen, acquired the area and named it Rancho Ojo del Agua de la Coche.

In 1850, Martin Murphy Sr.'s youngest son, Daniel Murphy, married Maria Fisher, heiress of the neighboring  Rancho Laguna Seca, thus combining the two estates. In 1853, Martin Murphy Sr.'s father, Bernard Murphy, died leaving the majority of the estate to Martin Murphy Sr., but a substantial portion to a Martin Murphy Sr.'s mother, Catherine, who then married James Dunne. In the history of Morgan Hill, the Murphy, Dunne, and Hill families are of the most prominent significance.

By the late 1850's, Californio ranchero José María Malaguerra began cultivating vineyards in Madrone, then an independent township just north of Morgan Hill. In 1869, he founded the Malaguerra Winery, the oldest extant winery in Santa Clara Valley, which is listed on the National Register of Historic Places.

In 1882, Daniel and Maria Murphy's daughter, Diana Murphy, fell in love with Missouri businessman Hiram Morgan Hill.  They married in secret, on account of his being a Quaker and her being from a prominent Roman Catholic family. When Daniel Murphy died, Diana and Hiram Morgan Hill inherited the  surrounding the original Murphy estate, near Murphy's Peak (now known as El Toro). In 1884, the Hills built their weekend estate, as the family primarily lived in San Francisco, dubbed Villa Mira Monte (Spanish for Mountain-View Estate).

By 1886, the family chose to live primarily at the Ojo del Agua rancho, as they jointly inherited  around the estate. However, the move was temporary, as scandal caused by the marital complications of Hiram Morgan Hill's prominent socialite sister, Sarah Althea Hill, and her husband, Senator William Sharon, made the Hills a source of social ridicule, thus causing them to start spending the majority of their time between San Francisco and Washington, D.C., thus leaving their rancho untouched for long periods of time.

In 1892, Hiram Morgan Hill contracted land developer C. H. Phillips to divide and liquidate the Rancho Ojo del Agua de la Coche, only retaining the Villa Mira Monte estate and the surrounding , which the Hill family would hold until 1916. By 1898, a significant community had built around what was then known as Morgan Hill's Ranch, and a Southern Pacific Railroad station was built in the Huntington area. Rather than ask to stop at Huntington station, passengers would ask to stop at "Morgan Hill's Ranch", which eventually shortened to "Morgan Hill".

On November 10, 1906, the planned community, a result of the divisions of C. H. Phillips, was incorporated as the Town of Morgan Hill. Hiram Morgan and Diana Hill's only child, Diana Murphy Hill, married the French nobleman, Baron Hadouin de Reinach-Werth, and thus Baron Hadouin started to help manage Hiram Morgan Hill's properties between California and Nevada. However, the baron was called back to France to serve in the military and never returned. In 1913, Hiram Morgan Hill died at his Elko estate in Nevada, thus leaving his properties to his daughter. Diana Murphy Hill later remarried, in 1916, to Sir George Rhodes, thus causing the Murphy heiress of the Morgan Hill estate to relocate to the United Kingdom, taking her and Hiram Morgan Hill's daughter, Diana Murphy Hill, thus finally selling off the Villa Mira Monte and ending the Hill family presence in the community named after them.

In 1959, Morgan Hill annexed Madrone, turning the former township into a Morgan Hill's northernmost district, bordering San Jose and Coyote Valley.

Geography
Lying in a roughly  southern extension of the Santa Clara Valley, it is bounded by the Santa Cruz Mountains to the west and the Diablo Range to the east.

Although there are no natural lakes or ponds within the city limits, there are several flood-control and water storage reservoirs in the adjacent hills which are operated by the Santa Clara Valley Water District, with recreational activities such as boating, etc., administered by the Santa Clara County Department of Parks and Recreation.

Morgan Hill is located within the seismically active San Francisco Bay region. The significant earthquakes in the region are generally associated with crustal movements along well-defined, active fault zones. Both faults have produced major earthquakes in the past, and have estimated maximum credible Richter magnitudes of 8.3 and 7.3, respectively. The 1984 Morgan Hill earthquake registered at a 6.2 magnitude.

Within Morgan Hill's area are a number of lakes and reservoirs, including Anderson Lake (eastern Morgan Hill), Uvas Reservoir (west), Chesbro Reservoir (west), and Coyote Lake (south).

The Coyote Creek Fault is located in Morgan Hill and is classified as potentially active as well. In addition, several unnamed faults traverse the western slopes of the upland areas. Geomorphic evidence suggests that these faults were active during recent geologic time. However, these fault-related geomorphic features are not as fresh as those of the active Calaveras Fault and are considered to be somewhat older.

Morgan Hill is one of very few sources for a type of semi-precious gemstone marketed under the name "Morgan Hill poppy jasper". According to geologists, this local variety of orbicular jasper formed through a combination of volcanic and seismic activity on the slopes of El Toro. Known extant deposits of the mineral are located on private lands, not accessible to the public.  A local business, El Toro Brewing Company, has a collection of poppy jasper on display at their rural Morgan Hill brewery and on a large bar top inlaid with the stone at their brewpub in downtown Morgan Hill.  Examples are also on display at the Morgan Hill Museum and at the Morgan Hill Community and Cultural Center. The local Poppy Jasper Film Festival is also named after the mineral.

The highlight of local geography is El Toro. According to a local legend of the early 1900s, author Bret Harte named the hill when he climbed it and discovered two bulls fighting near the summit (they subsequently chased him back down). The official name shown on the U.S. Geological Survey's maps is simply "El Toro", although locals may refer to the hill as "Murphy's Peak". Visitors, not aware of the origin of the town's name, often mistakenly assume that El Toro is "Morgan" Hill. It is USGS Feature ID# 223063 in the Geographic Names Information System (GNIS), maintained by the United States Board on Geographic Names. The iconic hill overshadowing the town to the west has been incorporated into the city's seal and official logo.

Neighborhoods 
Morgan Hill is divided into numerous neighborhoods, which can in turn be divided into smaller communities or areas. Morgan Hill's principal neighborhoods are:
Downtown (Morgan Hill's central entertainment and business district)
Madrone (former township which constitutes Morgan Hill's northwestern district)
Paradise Valley & Chesbro Lake
Llagas Valley
San Martin/South Morgan Hill (including unincorporated San Martin)
Coyote Valley/North Morgan Hill (including unincorporated Coyote Valley)
Anderson Lake (including residents of Henry W. Coe State Park)

Climate 
Due to the moderating influence of the Pacific Ocean, Morgan Hill experiences a mild, Mediterranean climate. Snowfall is rare, about once every 20 years, and is light and short-lived when it occurs. Summer months are characterized by coastal fog which arrives from the ocean around 10 p.m. and dissipates the next morning by 10 a.m. Winter months have many sunny and partly cloudy days, with frequent breaks between rainstorms. The local terrain is inconducive to tornadoes, severe windstorms and thunderstorms. The local climate supports chaparral and grassland biomes, with stands of live oak at higher elevations.

Demographics

2020
The 2020 United States census reported that Morgan Hill had a population of 45,483 people, with 14,721 households. The ethnic makeup of Morgan Hill was 62.8% White, 1.5% African American, 0.5% Native American, 15.8% Asian, 0.1% Pacific Islander, and 13.8% from two or more races. Hispanic or Latino of any race were 34.7% of the population.

2010

The 2010 U.S. Census reported that Morgan Hill had a population of 37,882. The ethnic makeup of Morgan Hill was 24,713 (65.2%) White, 746 (2.0%) African American, 335 (0.9%) Native American, 3,852 (10.2%) Asian, 125 (0.3%) Pacific Islander, 5,779 (15.3%) from other races, and 2,332 (6.2%) from two or more races. Hispanic or Latino of any race were 12,863 persons (34.0%).

The Census reported that 37,496 people (99.0% of the population) lived in households, 164 (0.4%) lived in non-institutionalized group quarters, and 222 (0.6%) were institutionalized.

There were 12,326 households, out of which 5,538 (44.9%) had children under the age of 18 living in them, 7,581 (61.5%) were opposite-sex married couples living together, 1,469 (11.9%) had a female householder with no husband present, 646 (5.2%) had a male householder with no wife present.  There were 660 (5.4%) unmarried opposite-sex partnerships, and 89 (0.7%) same-sex married couples or partnerships. 1,998 households (16.2%) were made up of individuals, and 757 (6.1%) had someone living alone who was 65 years of age or older. The average household size was 3.04.  There were 9,696 families (78.7% of all households); the average family size was 3.39.

The population was spread out, with 10,838 people (28.6%) under the age of 18, 2,909 people (7.7%) aged 18 to 24, 10,000 people (26.4%) aged 25 to 44, 10,537 people (27.8%) aged 45 to 64, and 3,598 people (9.5%) who were 65 years of age or older.  The median age was 36.8 years. For every 100 females, there were 97.9 males.  For every 100 females age 18 and over, there were 94.5 males.

The homeowner vacancy rate was 1.7%; the rental vacancy rate was 2.6%.  26,148 people (69.0% of the population) lived in owner-occupied housing units and 11,348 people (30.0%) lived in rental housing units.

2000 

The 2000 U.S. Census reported there were 33,556 people, 10,846 households, and 8,633 families residing in the city. The ethnic makeup of the city was 72.40% White, 1.71% African American, 1.08% Native American, 6.02% Asian, 0.23% Pacific Islander, 13.43% from other races, and 5.13% from two or more races. Hispanic or Latino of any race were 27.50% of the population.

There were 10,846 households, out of which 44.0% had children under the age of 18 living with them, 63.2% were married couples living together, 11.1% had a female householder with no husband present, and 20.4% were non-families. 15.1% of all households were made up of individuals, and 5.5% had someone living alone who was 65 years of age or older. The average household size was 3.05 and the average family size was 3.38.

In the city, the population was spread out, with 30.5% under the age of 18, 7.6% from 18 to 24, 31.7% from 25 to 44, 22.7% from 45 to 64, and 7.5% who were 65 years of age or older. The median age was 34 years. For every 100 females, there were 98.5 males. For every 100 females age 18 and over, there were 94.9 males.

According to a 2007 estimate, the median income for a household in the city was $99,243, and the median income for a family was $108,611. Males had a median income of $61,999 versus $42,003 for females. The per capita income for the city was $33,047. About 3.3% of families and 4.7% of the population were below the poverty threshold, including 5.4% of those under age 18 and 4.9% of those age 65 or over.

Substantial expansion of the population of Morgan Hill occurred from the late 1980s onward. This population expansion was enabled by the removal of a growth constraint in the form of sewage treatment capacity.

Economy

According to Forbes, Morgan Hill is one of the top 500 most expensive places to live in the United States. Business Insider ranked Morgan Hill as the 479th most expensive housing market in the United States, owing to its concentration of high-net-worth individuals and restrictive growth policies.

Morgan Hill, along with Saratoga, San Martin, and Gilroy make up the Santa Clara Valley AVA, a designated American Viticultural Area for wineries and vineyards within the historic Santa Clara Valley.

Numerous companies of other industries are based in Morgan Hill as well, such as Specialized Bicycle Components, a major global manufacturer of high performance bicycles.

Morgan Hill is served by the weekly Morgan Hill Times, founded in 1894 and published by New SV Media. The biweekly Morgan Hill Life, lifestyle publication, founded in 2013, is published by Morgan Hill Life, LLC.

Technology
Notable high tech companies that are headquartered or have their American headquarters in Morgan Hill include Anritsu (Japanese telecommunications company), Flextronics (the world's 2nd largest electronics-manufacturing service provider), Velodyne (sensor and laser developer), Hypnos Entertainment (video game company), TenCate Advanced Composites (Dutch advanced composite materials manufacturer), and the Paramit Corporation (high tech medical device manufacturer).

High tech companies that have research & development or manufacturing facilities in Morgan Hill include the Harris Corporation (information & defense contractor based in Madrone district), Infineon Technologies (semiconductor & chip manufacturer), and NxEdge Inc. (semiconductor & business solutions company).

Top employers
According to the City's 2018 Employment Report, the top employers in the city are:

Parks and recreation 

 Anderson Lake County Park, immediately east of Morgan Hill
 Coyote Creek Parks & Trails, north of Morgan Hill, extending to San Jose
Henry W. Coe State Park, the second-largest state park in California
Uvas Canyon County Park, located a few miles west of Morgan Hill in the Santa Cruz Mountains
 Galvan Park
 Morgan Hill Community Park, including a skate park and off-leash dog park
 Centennial Recreation Center, with gymnasium, indoor swimming pool, senior center, youth center and computer facility
 Morgan Hill Community and Cultural Center, amphitheater and satellite campus of Gavilan College
 Morgan Hill Aquatic Center
 Morgan Hill Outdoor Sports Center
 Villa Mira Monte

Government
Morgan Hill's government is composed of the Morgan Hill City Council, its legislative branch; the Mayor of Morgan Hill, its semi-executive branch; and the departments of Morgan Hill City Hall. The current Mayor of Morgan Hill is Mark Turner, who was elected to office in November, 2022. The current Morgan Hill City Manager is Christina Turner.

In the California State Legislature, Morgan Hill is represented through the 17th Senate District, represented by Democrat Bill Monning, and in the 30th Assembly District, represented by Democrat Robert Rivas.

The Morgan Hill Police Department is tasked with ensuring public safety within the city's incorporated borders. Chief Shane Palsgrove was appointed in 2020.

Education

Public education

The Morgan Hill Unified School District (MHUSD) serves the whole of Morgan Hill, as well as San Martin, California and Coyote Valley. MHUSD schools have variously been awarded as National Blue Ribbon Schools, California Distinguished Schools, and California Gold Ribbon Schools.

Morgan Hill's public high schools are:
Live Oak High School
Ann Sobrato High School (Ranked in top 100 best public schools in California)
Central High School

Alongside its traditional schools, MHUSD, in special partnership with The Tech Museum of Innovation, a leading Silicon Valley institution, operates 4 specialized public "focus academies", through its innovative Tech Academies Initiative: Focus Academies will provide the opportunity for students to specialize their studies within broad fields (engineering, STEAM, maths, music, health sciences), allowing for greater, in-depth learning within subjects within programs designed by noted subject matter experts, including scientists from The Tech Museum of Innovation and Stanford University medical professors.

Paradise Valley Engineering Academy
P.A. Walsh STEAM Academy (run in partnership with The Tech Museum of Innovation)
Jackson Academy of Maths & Music
El Toro Health Science Academy (first elementary-level health sciences program in California; created alongside Stanford University)
San Martin/Gwinn - Dual Immersion Mulitcultural Education (90/10 Spanish & English Dual Language Immersion)

Morgan Hill also hosts a campus of Gavilan College.

Private education
Morgan Hill is also home to numerous private school, both religious and nonsectarian in nature.

Nonsectarian schools:
Oakwood School, ranked as one of the best college preparatory schools in the Bay Area
Stratford School

Religious schools:
 Saint Catherine Catholic School
 Crossroads Christian School
 Spring Academy, alternative Christian school
 Shadow Mountain Baptist School

Infrastructure

Airports 

Public transportation 
 The Santa Clara Valley Transportation Authority provides local buses and express buses to Gilroy, San Martin, San Jose, Santa Clara, and Sunnyvale.
 Caltrain's Morgan Hill station provides weekday rush-hour commuter rail service to San Jose, the rest of Silicon Valley, the Peninsula and San Francisco.
 Monterey-Salinas Transit runs a rush-hour San Jose-Monterey express bus, Line 55, that also serves as an Amtrak Thruway Motorcoach connection.

Public libraries
Santa Clara County Library District operates the Morgan Hill Library.

Notable people

Culture
Kelly Moore, New York Times Best Selling author
John Battendieri, pioneer and leader of the organic movement
Thomas Kinkade, American Pastoral painter
Don Argue, former president of Northwest University 
Mary Blair, The Walt Disney Company animator, known best for Alice in Wonderland, Peter Pan, and Cinderella
Wade Dominguez, actor known for his role in Dangerous Minds
Charles Kellogg, famed Californian naturalist and actor
Tom R. Ferguson, world champion and inductee into the Rodeo Hall of Fame
Cornelia Barns, 19th century Feminist activist
Dennis Johnson, pioneering composer of minimalist music and California Institute of Technology mathematician 
Cathie Taylor, Academy of Country Music award-winning singer

Sciences
Konstantin Batygin, Caltech astronomer 
Helder Antunes, Cisco Systems executive, founder of the OpenFog Consortium
Ole Fahlin, Aviator and Lockheed Martin developer
Charles Edward Barns, astronomer and author
Stephen C. Johnson, AT&T and Bell Labs computer scientist
Stav Prodromou, CEO of Alien Technology

Athletics
Zhang Jinjing, Chinese Olympic gymnast
Marina Klimova, Soviet Olympic ice dancer
Romina Gupta, Team USA gold medal gymnastics champion
Alatini Saulala, Tongan rugby player for the USA National Team
Scott Clark, BMX world champion
Conrad Stoltz, four time XTERRA Triathlon
Jared Allen, football player for the Chicago Bears
Bob Stoddard, baseball player for the Seattle Mariners and the Kansas City Royals
Dana Stubblefield, football player for the San Francisco 49ers 
Bill Berry, former basketball coach for the Chicago Bulls
Ricky Berry, basketball player for the Sacramento Kings
Ron Caragher, football coach for the San Jose State Spartans and University of San Diego
Rhett Hall, football player for the Philadelphia Eagles
Daniel Holloway, cyclist and multiple National Criterium champion
James Hibbard, cycling champion
Jerry Doggett, famed MLB sportscaster
Ryan Neufeld, football player for the Dallas Cowboys
Mervyn Fernandez, football player for the Oakland Raiders
Jeff Ulbrich, football coach for the Atlanta Falcons, former player for the San Francisco 49ers
Dave Salzwedel, soccer player for the San Jose Clash
Jimmy Vasser, champion IndyCar racer

Sister cities

 Mizuho, Tokyo, Japan
 San Martín de Hidalgo, Jalisco, Mexico
 San Casciano in Val di Pesa, Tuscany, Italy
 Headford, County Galway, Ireland
 Seferihisar, Izmir, Turkey

Gallery

See also

 List of California locations by income

References

External links

 
 Visit Morgan Hill
 Morgan Hill Historical Society

 
Cities in Santa Clara County, California
Cities in the San Francisco Bay Area
Populated places established in 1906
Incorporated cities and towns in California
Silicon Valley
1906 establishments in California